The Budapest Marathon is an annual marathon and sport event hosted by the city of Budapest, Hungary, usually held in early October or late September.  The current version of the marathon has been held since 1984, although an annual marathon has taken place in Budapest since 1961.  Budapest Sportiroda ('Budapest Sports Office') (BSI) has organized the marathon since 1989.

History

Csepeli Nemzetközi era 

This marathon was held annually in either late October or early November with this name until at least 1980.

The Association of Road Racing Statisticians (ARRS) also notes that a marathon was run annually in either late October or early November with the name "Budapest" from 1981 to 1990, and considers it as part of the same race series.

BTSH and BSI era 

Like many sports, running in Hungary was limited to professional athletes only.

In 1984, the Budapesti Testnevelési és Sporthivatal ('Budapest Physical Education and Sports Office') (BTSH) organized a marathon that also allowed amateur runners to compete.  The event would be held in spring. A half marathon and a shorter race for school children was also held alongside the event. This would continue until 1996, when the Budapest Half Marathon became an independent race.

It consisted of two loops, 21 km each. 625 men and 25 women from 18 countries reached the finish line. The results of the race can still be found on the marathon's official website. The official sponsor of the event was the  travel agency, which remained for the next ten years.

In 1986 the Budapest Marathon became an AIMS member, the first one in Eastern Europe. The prize for winning the race was a trip to New York to participate in the New York City Marathon, provided the winner finishes under 2:18 (man) or 2:40 (woman).

In 1987, with full AIMS membership, the race attracted more international participants and  the number of runners passed 1000. This was also the first time that every finisher received a medal.

In 1989, the Budapest Sportiroda ('Budapest Sports Office') (BSI) began to organize the marathon.

In 1993 the official sponsor was changed to Mars. Fred Lebow, the founder of the New York City Marathon and of Hungarian origin was the guest star of the event (he ran a half marathon).

The marathon was not held in 1994 and 1995 due to financial difficulties. In 1996, the marathon event was moved to autumn, while the half marathon remained in spring. The sponsor was changed to Kaiser's-Plus.

In 2009 SPAR bought Plus, which meant the marathon's name was also changed to "SPAR Budapest Marathon", which it remains. This year saw over 13,000 participants, with 2,388 running the full length. The number of people increased every year, so in 2016 there were over 28,000 participants, with 4,969 running the whole marathon.

Course 

The start and finish is located in front of the Lágymányosi campus of Eötvös Loránd University.  The race center used to be situated at the Városliget (City Park), with the race starting in Hősök tere (Heroes' Square).

The course of the marathon changes every year, but the main routes usually remain.  Due to the large number of participants a "zoned start" is implemented, where each subsequent zone starts a little bit later. It takes more than 15 minutes for the runners from the last zone to cross the starting line.

The marathon passes through two UNESCO World Heritage sites. It also crosses the Danube several times. There are many music performers along the route. While there are usually crowds along the route, there are several "crowd support points" where large groups of people cheer. These points are well organized (usually near metro stations) so that people can go from one point to another quickly and find their friend or family member that is running.

Other activities 

After the race is over, competitors can bathe their aching feet in the Széchenyi thermal bath (usually for free thought this can change).

Management 

The Budapest Marathon is managed by BSI, led by Árpád Kocsis. BSI is an acronym for "Budapest Sport Bureau". The organization always needs to delicately position itself to produce profit, while at the same time keep politicians happy. Almost every marathon has either the mayor or a minister as the "main patron" of the event. Budapest has a loud group of people that don't want the race to be held in the city center (due to the road closures that inevitably occur), which forces BSI always to be close to the party currently in power.

Winners 

Among men, the time of 2:15:04 time from 1984, set by Zoltán Kiss, is still a record. Among women, Simona Staicu has the best time ever, she was able to stand on the podium four times and in 2010 she completed the distance in 2:37:47.

Key:
  Course record
  Hungarian championship race

Csepeli Nemzetközi era

BTSH and BSI era

Notes

References

List of winners
Budapest Marathon. Association of Road Racing Statisticians (2011-10-03). Retrieved on 2011-10-16.
History of the marathon from the organizer's website (in Hungarian)

External links
 Official website
 Course animations from 2017

Sport in Budapest
Marathons in Hungary
Recurring sporting events established in 1961
Athletics competitions in Hungary
Autumn events in Hungary